Christos Tsekos may refer to:
 Christos Tzekos, Greek athletics coach.
 Christos Tsekos (basketball), Greek retired national basketball player